The following is a list of radio stations in the Canadian province of Saskatchewan, .

External links
Canadian Communications Foundation History of Radio stations in the Province of Saskatchewan

Saskatchewan
Radio stations